Tab Virgil Jr. (born February 8, 1981) better known by his stage name Turk (sometimes "Young Turk" or "Hot Boy Turk"), is an American rapper from New Orleans, Louisiana. He is best known for his late 1990s run at Birdman's Cash Money Records with the group the Hot Boys.

Early life
Virgil was born February 8, 1981, in New Orleans, Louisiana, to his mother "Gal" and his father Tab Virgil Sr. He grew up in the Magnolia Projects in the Third Ward and attended Fortier High School before dropping out. He was discovered by Birdman rapping with Magnolia Shorty at a block party.

Career

Turk's debut major appearance was on Juvenile's 400 Degreez album, being featured on the songs "Welcome 2 Tha Nolia", " Ha (Hot Boys Remix)", and "Rich Niggaz".

His debut album Young & Thuggin' became a Top 10 hit on the Billboard 200. After the split of the Hot Boys in 2001 and his departure from Cash Money in 2003, he signed a deal with producer Ke'Noe at Laboratory Recordz and released two albums Raw & Uncut and Penitentiary Chances. In 2005, Turk was convicted on federal charges of being a felon in possession of a firearm, a fugitive from justice in possession of a firearm, and an unlawful user addicted to a controlled substance in possession of a firearm. The charges arose from the shooting of a Memphis, Tennessee police officer in early 2004. He was sentenced to 10 years of incarceration. In 2006, he entered an Alford plea in Tennessee state court to second-degree attempted murder, based on the same incident, and was sentenced to 14 years imprisonment.

While incarcerated Ke'Noe released two albums of unreleased Turk verses called Still A Hot Boy and Convicted Felons. The albums profits of the last two releases were put on Turk's prison books. Turk was released from prison in October 2012 after almost nine years of incarceration. In December 2012, Turk made a hit single titled "Zip It" featuring Lil Wayne. Weeks later, a remix with Juvenile was made and released. In February 2013, a version with Turk, Lil Wayne, Juvenile and B.G. was made, making an  official Hot Boys reunion song. Turk released a mixtape under SoundCloud called "Blame It On The System".

Legal issues 
On January 26, 2004, at around 2:00pm local time, dozens of Shelby County Narcotics Officers and SWAT officers served a search warrant for drugs believed to be inside Turk's apartment in the Hickory Pointe Community in Southeast Memphis. After knocking on the door and identifying themselves led to no response, the officers entered and began searching the apartment. Turk then allegedly shot at them with a 9mm handgun. The officers and SWAT returned fire, engaging in a 15-minute shootout with Turk. Turk finally surrendered to Shelby County officers and the SWAT Team. Turk was charged Wednesday, January 28, 2004, with first-degree attempted murder for allegedly shooting two Memphis, Tennessee Police Officers.

In February 2015, Turk filed lawsuit against Cash Money Records for $1.3 million, over unpaid royalties for recordings dating back to 1999, including solo work from his debut Young & Thuggin''' and group, the Hot Boys. The rapper eventually won the suit by default, when Cash Money failed to respond. However, in June 2015, Turk requested that the lawsuit be dismissed after both parties reached an amicable settlement.

Discography

Studio albums
 Young & Thuggin' (2001)
 Raw & Uncut (2003)
 Penitentiary Chances (2004)
 Still A Hot Boy (2005)
 Convicted Felons (2006)
 Rich Thuggin (2022)

Collaboration albums
 Get It How U Live! with Hot Boys (1997)
 Guerrilla Warfare with Hot Boys (1999)
 Baller Blockin' with Cash Money Millionaires (2000)
 Let 'Em Burn'' with Hot Boys (2003)

References

External links
 

1981 births
20th-century American musicians
African-American male rappers
American prisoners and detainees
Cash Money Records artists
Living people
Rappers from New Orleans
African-American male singer-songwriters
African-American male singers
Gangsta rappers
Rap-A-Lot Records artists
21st-century American rappers
20th-century American male musicians
21st-century American male musicians
20th-century African-American musicians
21st-century African-American musicians
American rappers
Musicians from New Orleans
People from Louisiana
Hot Boys members
American singers
Cash Money Millionaires members